This is a list of musicians and musical groups from the Democratic Republic of Congo (formerly Zaire).

Abeti Masikini
African Fiesta
Avelino
Awilo Longomba
Bimi Ombale
Bisso Na Bisso
Bouro Mpela
Bozi Boziana
Cindy Le Coeur
Dadju
Damso
Dany Engobo
Evoloko Jocker
Diblo Dibala
Dindo Yogo
Fabregas
Fally Ipupa
Ferré Gola
Gaz Mawete
Geo Bilongo
Gibson Butukondolo
Grand Kalle
Héritier Watanabe
INNOSS'B
Iyenga
Jean Bosco Mwenda
Jessy Matador
Jimmy Omonga
Josky Kiambukuta Londa
Kalash Criminel
Kanda Bongo Man
Kasai Allstars
Kaysha
Keblack
Kékélé
King Kester Emeneya
Koffi Olomide
Konono Nº1
Kasaloo Kyanga
LU KALA
Langa Langa Stars
Le Grand Kalle
Lokua Kanza
Madilu Système
Maître Gims
Marie Daulne
Marie Misamu
Mayaula Mayoni
Mbongwana Star
M'bilia Bel
Michel Boyibanda
Mohombi
Mose Fan Fan
M'Pongo Love
Naza
Ndombe Opetum
Nico Kasanda
Ninho
Papa Wemba
Pepe Kalle and Empire Bakuba
Ray Lema
Sam Mangwana
Singuila
Tabu Ley Rochereau
Werrason
Youlou Mabiala
Yxng Bane
Youssoupha

References

 
Musicians
Democratic Republic of the Congo